Federico Borrell García (January 3, 1912 – September 5, 1936) was a Spanish Republican and anarchist militiaman during the Spanish Civil War, commonly thought to be the subject in the famous Robert Capa photo The Falling Soldier.

Biography
He was born in Benilloba, Valencian Community, and went by the nickname "Taino". He worked at a mill in Alcoi and he founded the local branch of the anarchist Iberian Federation of Libertarian Youth (FIJL).  He joined the local Loyalist militia, the Columna Alcoiana, set up to defend the Spanish Republic against the Spanish Nationalist forces of Francisco Franco.

According to some sources, on the morning of September 5, 1936, Borrell was one of about fifty men who arrived at Cerro Muriano in Córdoba to reinforce the militia against Francoist forces commanded by General José Enrique Varela. During that afternoon Borrell was defending the artillery battery to the rear of the Alcoi infantry when enemy troops infiltrated behind the Loyalists and fired at them from behind. Borrell was fatally shot around five o’clock on or near the hill known as La Loma de las Malagueñas. According to Spanish government records, he was the only member of the Columna Alcoiana to die in the fighting at Cerro Muriano that day. Everisto García, his brother, identified him from the photo.

Other versions claim that Borrell could have been shot and killed by rebels when posing for Robert Capa. The 2007 documentary La sombra del iceberg claims that the picture was staged and that Borrell is not the individual in the picture.

It is not known where Borrell, or the other, unidentified, militiaman killed shortly after, are buried, although the most likely place is the nearby cemetery at Villaharta.

References

External links
  Pagni, Luca. "Robert Capa & la foto del miliziano"

1912 births
1936 deaths
People from Comtat
Spanish anarchists
Spanish military personnel of the Spanish Civil War (Republican faction)
Military personnel killed in the Spanish Civil War
Spanish casualties of the Spanish Civil War
People notable for being the subject of a specific photograph